The 21st Satellite Awards is an award ceremony honoring the year's outstanding performers, films, television shows, home videos and interactive media, presented by the International Press Academy.

The nominations were announced on November 28, 2016. The winners were announced on December 19, 2016. The ceremony took place on February 19, 2017.

The following day after the nominations were announced, the nominations for Master of None (Best Television Series – Musical or Comedy) and Laurie Metcalf (Best Actress in a Musical or Comedy Series for Getting On) were rescinded for being ineligible in 2016.

Special achievement awards
Auteur Award (for singular vision and unique artistic control over the elements of production) – Tom Ford

Humanitarian Award (for making a difference in the lives of those in the artistic community and beyond) – Patrick Stewart

Mary Pickford Award (for outstanding contribution to the entertainment industry) – Edward James Olmos

Nikola Tesla Award (for visionary achievement in filmmaking technology) – John Toll

Best First Feature – Rusudan Glurjidze (House of Others)

Motion picture winners and nominees

Winners are listed first and highlighted in bold.

Films with multiple nominations

Films with multiple wins

Television winners and nominees

Winners are listed first and highlighted in bold.

Series with multiple nominations

Series with multiple wins

New Media winners and nominees

References

External links
 International Press Academy website

Satellite Awards ceremonies
2016 film awards
2016 television awards
2016 video game awards